Enteromius humeralis is a species of ray-finned fish in the genus Enteromius from the upper Congo River basin, in the Central African Republic, Democratic Republic of Congo and Congo.

Footnotes 

 

Enteromius
Taxa named by George Albert Boulenger
Fish described in 1902